
Year 1529 (MDXXIX) was a common year starting on Friday (link will display the full calendar) of the Julian calendar.

Events 

 January–June 
 February 2 – The Örebro Synod provides the theological foundation of the Swedish Reformation, following the economic foundation of it, after the Reduction of Gustav I of Sweden.
 March –  Battle of Shimbra Kure: Imam Ahmad ibn Ibrahim al-Ghazi, with 200 men armed with matchlocks, defeats the army of Dawit II, Emperor of Ethiopia.
 March 25 – Blood libel against the Jewish community of Bosen (formerly in Hungary, today in Slovakia), on the first day of Passover. Three Jews are accused and killed, while the boy is discovered alive, kidnapped for the benefit of the scheme.
 April 8 – The Flensburg Disputation is held, a debate attended by Stadtholder Christian of Schleswig-Holstein (later King Christian III of Denmark), between Lutherans (led by Hermann Fast) and the more radical Anabaptists (led by Melchior Hoffman). Johannes Bugenhagen, a close associate of Martin Luther, presides. The Disputation marks the rejection of radical ideas by the Danish Reformation.
 April 9 – The Westrogothian rebellion breaks out in Sweden.
 April 19 – Diet of Speyer: A group of rulers (German: Fürst) and independent cities (German: Reichsstadt) protest the reinstatement of the Edict of Worms, beginning the Protestant movement.
 April 22 – The Treaty of Zaragoza divides the eastern hemisphere between the Spanish and Portuguese empires, stipulating that the dividing line should lie 297.5 leagues or 17° east of the Moluccas.
 May–July – Cardinal Thomas Wolsey, Archbishop of York, presides over a legatine court at Blackfriars, London, to rule on the legality of King Henry VIII of England's marriage to Catherine of Aragon.
 May 10 – The Ottoman army under Suleiman I leaves Constantinople, to invade Hungary once again.
 June 21 – War of the League of Cognac – Battle of Landriano: French forces in northern Italy are decisively defeated by Spain.

 July–December 
 July 30 – The only continental outbreak of English sweating sickness reaches Lübeck, spreading from there into Schleswig-Holstein in the next few months.
 August 5 – Charles V, Holy Roman Emperor, and Francis I of France sign the Treaty of Cambrai, or Ladies' Peace in the War of the League of Cognac: Francis abandons his claims in Italy, but is allowed to retain the Duchy of Burgundy. Henry VIII of England accedes on August 27.
 September 1 – Sancti Spiritu, the first European settlement in Argentina, is destroyed by local natives.
 September 8
 Buda is recaptured by the invading forces of the Ottoman Empire.
 The city of Maracaibo, Venezuela is founded by Ambrosius Ehinger.
 September 27 – Siege of Vienna: Vienna is besieged by the Ottoman forces of Suleiman the Magnificent.
 October 15 – With the season growing late, Suleiman abandons the Siege of Vienna (a turning point in the Ottoman wars in Europe).
 October 26 – Cardinal Wolsey falls from power in England, due to his failure to prevent Habsburg expansion in Europe, and obtain an annulment of Henry VIII's marriage. Thomas More succeeds him as Lord Chancellor.
 November 4–December 17 – The English Reformation Parliament is first seated.

 Date unknown 
 Aylesbury is granted the county town of Buckinghamshire, England by King Henry VIII.
 Stephen Báthory becomes governor of Transylvania.
 Borommarachathirat IV succeeds Ramathibodi II as king of Ayutthaya.
 Fluorite is first described, by Georg Agricola.
 Giorgio Vasari visits Rome.
 Pietro Bembo becomes historiographer of Venice.
 Heinrich Bullinger becomes pastor of Bremgarten, Switzerland.
 Paracelsus uses that name for the first time and visits Nuremberg.
 German polymath Heinrich Cornelius Agrippa publishes Declamatio de nobilitate et praecellentia foeminei sexus ("Declamation on the Nobility and Preeminence of the Female Sex"), a book pronouncing the theological and moral superiority of women.
 A summit level canal between Alster and the Trave in Germany opens to navigation.

Births 

 January 8 – John Frederick II, Duke of Saxony (d. 1595)
 January 13 – Ebba Månsdotter, Swedish noble (d. 1609)
 February 14 – Markus Fugger, German businessman (d. 1597)
 February 23 – Onofrio Panvinio, Augustinian historian (d. 1568)
 April 3 – Michael Neander, German mathematician and historian (d. 1581)
 April 25 – Francesco Patrizi, Italian philosopher and scientist (d. 1597)
 May 12 – Sabina of Brandenburg-Ansbach, German princess (d. 1575)
 June 7 – Étienne Pasquier, French lawyer, poet and author (d. 1615)
 June 14 – Ferdinand II, Archduke of Austria, regent of Tyrol and Further Austria (d. 1595)
 July 16 – Petrus Peckius the Elder, Dutch jurist, writer on international maritime law (d. 1589)
 July 20 – Henry Sidney, lord deputy of Ireland (d. 1586)
 July 24 – Charles II, Margrave of Baden-Durlach (d. 1577)
 August 10 – Ernst Vögelin, German publisher (d. 1589)
 September 1 – Taddeo Zuccari, Italian painter (d. 1566)
 September 25 – Günther XLI, Count of Schwarzburg-Arnstadt (d. 1583)
 October 26 – Anna of Hesse, Countess Palatine of Zweibrücken (d. 1591)
 December 11 – Fulvio Orsini, Italian humanist historian (d. 1600)
 December 16 – Laurent Joubert, French physician (d. 1582)
 date unknown
 Titu Cusi, Inca ruler of Vilcabamba (d. 1571)
 Giambologna, Italian sculptor (d. 1608)
 Michał Wiśniowiecki, Ruthenian prince at Wiśniowiec (d. 1584)
 George Puttenham, English critic (d. 1590)

Deaths 

 January 7 – Peter Vischer the Elder, German sculptor (b. 1455)
 January 9 – Wang Yangming, Chinese Neo-Confucian scholar (b. 1472)
January 29 - Ōuchi Yoshioki, Japanese daimyo (b. 1477)
 February 2 – Baldassare Castiglione, Italian writer and diplomat (b. 1478)
 February 4 – Ludwig Haetzer, German Protestant reformer (executed) (b. 1500)
 March 28 – Philipp II, Count of Hanau-Münzenberg (b. 1501)
 April 20 – Silvio Passerini, Italian cardinal and lord of Florence (b. 1469)
 May 12 – Cecily Bonville, 7th Baroness Harington (b. c. 1460)
 June 21 – John Skelton, English poet (b. c. 1460)
 September 6 – George Blaurock, Swiss founder of the Anabaptist Church (b. 1491)
 September 27 – George of the Palatinate, German nobleman; Bishop of Speyer (1513–1529) (b. 1486)
 November 20 – Karl von Miltitz, German papal nuncio (b. c. 1490)
 date unknown
 Krishnadevaraya, Vijaynagar emperor
 Richard Pynson, Norman-born English printer (b. 1448)
 Andrea Sansovino, Italian sculptor (b. 1467)
 Petrus Särkilahti, Finnish Lutheran and scientist
 Paulus Aemilius Veronensis, Italian historian (b. 1455)
 probable – Lo Spagna, Italian painter
 possible – La Malinche, Nahua (native Mexican) interpreter and translator for Hernán Cortés, during the Conquest of Mexico

References